Bram Verbist (born 5 March 1983 in Antwerp) is a Belgian professional football goalkeeper.

Career
At Germinal Beerschot, he used to be second choice after Brazilian goalie Luciano, who is now at FC Groningen. In 2006, Verbist made an unsuccessful move to Belgian second division team Tienen. Quite shortly after this move he was loaned to Eendracht Aalst playing in Belgian Promotion A, the fourth level of Belgian football. But even there, his performances were not left uncriticised.

In July 2007 however, Verbist received a 10-day trial at first division team Cercle Brugge and then signed a contract with the green and black side for 1 year. In August 2013, one week before closure of the transfer period, Verbist was told by the board from Cercle that he quickly needed to find another team, because Cercle loaned Joris Delle from OGC Nice for one year. He failed to do that, and was "relegated" to fourth goalkeeper, after Joris Delle, Jo Coppens and Miguel Van Damme.
on 25 January 2014 Verbist signed a 4 months contract with the Danish side Brøndby IF as 2nd keeper due to an injured Michael Falkesgaard. On 28 June 2014, Verbist signed a two-year deal with Dutch Eerste Divisie side Roda JC Kerkrade.

Coaching career
After retiring, Verbist was appointed goalkeeper coach at K Beerschot VA under newly appointed manager Marc Brys. Verbist followed Brys to Sint-Truidense V.V. ahead of the 2018-19 season. On 26 November 2019, Brys and his staff, including Verbist, was fired.

References

External links
 

1983 births
Living people
Belgian footballers
Association football goalkeepers
Beerschot A.C. players
K.A.A. Gent players
AFC Ajax players
S.C. Eendracht Aalst players
Cercle Brugge K.S.V. players
K.V.K. Tienen-Hageland players
Brøndby IF players
Roda JC Kerkrade players
Eredivisie players
Eerste Divisie players
Belgian Pro League players
Challenger Pro League players
Belgian expatriate footballers
Expatriate men's footballers in Denmark
Expatriate footballers in the Netherlands
Belgian expatriate sportspeople in Denmark
Belgian expatriate sportspeople in the Netherlands
Footballers from Antwerp
Oud-Heverlee Leuven non-playing staff